Momčilović (Cyrillic script: Момчиловић) is a Serbian patronymic surname derived from a masculine given name Momčilo. It may refer to:

Ivica Momčilović (born 1967), football manager
Marko Momčilović (born 1987), footballer

Serbian surnames
Patronymic surnames